My Only Love is a Philippine television drama romance series broadcast by GMA Network. Based on a 1982 Philippine film of the same title, the series is the fifth instalment of Sine Novela. Directed by Louie Ignacio, it stars Mark Herras, Rhian Ramos and Bianca King. It premiered on November 12, 2007 on the network's Dramarama sa Hapon line up replacing Kung Mahawi Man ang Ulap. The series concluded on February 29, 2008 with a total of 79 episodes. It was replaced by Kaputol ng Isang Awit in its timeslot.

Cast and characters

Lead cast
 Rhian Ramos as Cindy Moreno
 Mark Herras as Billy Soriano
 Bianca King as Trixie

Supporting cast
 Alfred Vargas as Emman
 Rita Avila as Camille
 Sherilyn Reyes as Loren
 Gladys Reyes as Pearl
 Stef Prescott as Tiffany
 Ana Capri as Magda
 Daniel Fernando as Luisito
 Ruby Rodriguez as Tessie
 Tessbomb as Paris
 Kevin Santos as Paul
 Marco Alcaraz as Jonas
 Chariz Solomon as Marge
 Paulo Avelino as Alvin

Guest cast
 Lloyd Samartino as Ricardo
 Gail Lardizabal as Innah
 Krystal Reyes as young Cindy
 Renz Valerio as young Billy
 Ella Guevara as young Trixie
 Joy Folloso as young Tiffany

Ratings
According to AGB Nielsen Philippines' Mega Manila household television ratings, the pilot episode of My Only Love earned a 19.8% rating. While the final episode scored a 20.7% rating.

Accolades

References

External links
 

2007 Philippine television series debuts
2008 Philippine television series endings
Filipino-language television shows
GMA Network drama series
Live action television shows based on films
Philippine romance television series
Television shows set in the Philippines